Mikhail Youzhny and Nenad Zimonjić defeated Martin Damm and Leander Paes 6–1, 7–6 (3) to win the 2007 Qatar ExxonMobil Open doubles event.

Seeds

  Jonas Björkman /  Max Mirnyi (first round)
  Mark Knowles /  Daniel Nestor (semifinals)
  Martin Damm /  Leander Paes (finals)
  Mariusz Fyrstenberg /  Marcin Matkowski (quarterfinals)

Draw

Draw

External links
Association of Tennis Professionals (ATP) Main Doubles Draw

2007 Qatar Open
2007 ATP Tour
Qatar Open (tennis)